Frank Alvan Williams (October 6, 1851 – January 30, 1945) was a justice of the Supreme Court of Texas from May 1899 to April 1911.

References

Justices of the Texas Supreme Court
1851 births
1945 deaths